Donga Science (과학동아) is a monthly magazine about science  published in South Korea. It was first published in January 1986 with the motto "the joy of science is a window to the future" (과학을 느끼는 즐거움, 미래를 보는 창). 

The magazine contains information about science, including new discoveries and breakthroughs. The company has created a similar math magazine (수학동아) and children's science magazine (어린이 과학동아).

History 
The magazine was first published by the magazine company Donga-Il-bo, but since 2000 it is made by Donga Science, which was separated from the original company. It is the longest-running monthly science magazine in Korea.

References

External links

 
1986 establishments in South Korea
Magazines established in 1986
Monthly magazines
Science and technology magazines
Magazines published in South Korea